Rosine Faugouin (11 June 1930 – 19 May 2018) was a French sprinter. She competed in the women's 200 metres at the 1948 Summer Olympics.

References

External links
 

1930 births
2018 deaths
Athletes (track and field) at the 1948 Summer Olympics
French female sprinters
Olympic athletes of France
Place of birth missing
Olympic female sprinters